Professor Ravindra "Ravi" Kumar Gupta  is a professor of clinical microbiology at the Cambridge Institute of Therapeutic Immunology and Infectious Disease at the University of Cambridge. He is also a member of the faculty of the Africa Health Research Institute in Durban, South Africa.

Gupta was named in Times 100 Most Influential People in 2020.

Education 
Gupta attended Brentwood School from 1987 to 1994. Gupta gained his undergraduate medical degree from Cambridge University in 1997 and then clinical degree from Oxford University in 2001, whilst completing a Master in Public Health at Harvard School of Public Health (1998-1999). He subsequently trained in infectious diseases in Oxford and The Hospital for Tropical Diseases (UCLH) and completed a PhD in Virology with Deenan Pillay and Greg Towers at UCL. He was elected to Fellowship of the Academy of Medical Sciences in 2021 and to Fellowship of the Royal Society of Biologists in 2022.

Career 
Gupta researches HIV, from basic science of how the virus interacts with human cells and the immune system to the emerging problem of drug resistant HIV. More recently he has worked on COVID-19 rapid diagnostics, SARS-CoV-2 intra host evolution, replication, cell tropism and entry, as well as evasion from B cell immunity.

Gupta was formerly Full Professor at University College London (2016-2019). He is head of the Gupta Lab and has been a Wellcome Trust Fellowship holder since 2007.

Gupta's HIV-1 work spans the UK and sub Saharan Africa. The lab focuses on two areas:
 HIV drug resistance and implications for global scale up of antiretroviral therapy.   
 Dissecting the biology of macrophage-virus interactions given myeloid cells are parasitised by HIV and are a difficult-to-treat reservoir.

Gupta has worked in HIV drug resistance both at molecular and population levels, and his work showing exponential rises in transmitted HIV resistance in Africa through multi-country collaborations alongside WHO (Gupta et al, Lancet 2012, Gupta et al, Lancet Infectious Diseases 2018) led to change in WHO treatment guidelines for HIV, with recommendation for use of integrate inhibitors as first line core drugs. Gupta also reported the problem of tenofovir resistance in low-middle income settings and defined its emergence and characteristics through establishing the TenoRes collaboration with Bob Shafer at Stanford (Gregson et al, Lancet Infectious diseases 2016; Gregson et al, Lancet Infectious diseases 2017). His drug resistance work has more recently also revealed the dynamics of virus evolution under non-suppressive protease inhibitor based ART (Kemp et al mBio 2022), and revealed novel resistance determinants to protease inhibitors (Datir et al, mBio 2020).

In March 2019 it was reported that Gupta led a team demonstrating HIV remission in a HIV positive man with advanced Hodgkin's lymphoma following an 'unrelated' stem cell transplant, the so-called London Patient. After a bone marrow transplant from an HIV-resistant donor, the London Patient remained "cured" of his HIV.  This is the second case of a patient cured of HIV (Gupta et al, Nature 2019, Gupta et al, Lancet HIV 2020). The first patient is referred to as the Berlin Patient. 

During his time working on HIV reservoirs, he discovered why macrophages are infected in vivo by revealing cell cycle transitions in macrophages that radically changed virus susceptibility via SAMHD1 and availability of dNTP for reverse transcription (Mlcochova et al, EMBO J 2016). He went on to show that drugs like etoposide and bacterial LPS could arrest macrophages, rendering them HIV resistant (Mlcochova et al, EMBO J 2017, Mlcochova et al, Cell Reports 2019).

During COVID-19 pandemic Gupta, along with SAMBA II inventor Helen Lee, brought the first rapid near patient nucleic acid testing to the clinic (Collier et al, Cell Reports Medicine 2020) followed by work using antibody testing to increase diagnostic accuracy in the second phase of the illness (Mlcochova et al, Cell Reports Medicine 2020). This work was internationally recognized.

Most importantly, Gupta's group reported the first evidence for immune escape and infectivity enhancement of SARS-CoV-2 within host, driven by convalescent plasma, thus also defining the process by which new variants likely arise in immune compromised individuals (Kemp et al, Nature 2021). This work informed infection control policies for immune compromised hosts. Follow up work has defined the  replication advantages of Alpha (Meng et al, Cell Reports 2021) and Delta variants with highly efficient ability to fuse cells (Mlcochova et al, Nature 2021), and the tropism shift and immune escape of Omicron (Meng et al, Nature 2022). These observations have translated to the clinic, reflecting disease severity of Delta versus Omicron and critically aiding public health policy regarding newly emerging variants at global scale.

References

Living people
Year of birth missing (living people)
HIV/AIDS researchers
Physicians of University College Hospital
Alumni of University College London
Alumni of the University of Cambridge
Harvard School of Public Health alumni